The following is a list of awards and honors conferred on Polish politician, trade-union organizer, and human-rights activist Lech Wałęsa.

Honors
Apart from his 1983 Nobel Peace Prize, Wałęsa has received many other international distinctions and awards. He has been named "Man of the Year" by Time Magazine (1981), The Financial Times (1980) and The Observer (1980). He was the first recipient of the Liberty Medal, on 4 July 1989 in Philadelphia, Pennsylvania, and that same year received the Presidential Medal of Freedom. He is the third foreigner and the first non-head-of-state to have addressed a joint session of the United States Congress (15 November 1989).

On 8 February 2002, Wałęsa represented Europe, carrying the Olympic flag at the opening ceremonies of the XIX Olympic Winter Games in Salt Lake City, in company with Archbishop Desmond Tutu (Africa), John Glenn (the Americas), Kazuyoshi Funaki (Asia), Cathy Freeman (Oceania), Jean-Michel Cousteau (Environment), Jean-Claude Killy (Sport), and Steven Spielberg (Culture). Two years later, on 10 May 2004, Gdańsk International Airport was officially renamed Gdańsk Lech Wałęsa Airport to commemorate a famous Gdańsk citizen, and his signature was incorporated into the airport's logo.

A month later, in June 2004, Wałęsa represented Poland at the state funeral of Ronald Reagan. On 11 October 2006, Wałęsa was  keynote speaker at the launch of "International Human Solidarity Day," proclaimed in 2005 by the United Nations General Assembly. In January 2007 Wałęsa spoke at a Taiwan event, "Towards a Global Forum on New Democracies," in support of peace and democracy, along with other prominent world leaders and Taiwan's President Chen Shui-bian.

On 25 April 2007, Wałęsa represented the Polish government at the funeral of Boris Yeltsin, former President of the Russian Federation. On 23 October 2009, he spoke at a conference in Gdansk of presidents of all European senates, commemorating the 20th anniversary of the first free parliamentary elections in a former communist country – the 1989 elections to the Polish Senate.

On 6 September 2011, Wałęsa rejected Lithuania's Order of Vytautas the Great as a result of constant discrimination on the part of the Lithuanian government towards its Polish minority.

Decorations

A partial list of Wałęsa's honors and awards.

State decorations

Orders and awards

Man of the Year prizes

Honorary

Honorary doctorates

Wałęsa has been awarded over 100 honorary doctorates  by universities around the world.

Honorary citizenship

Other

Places named after Lech Wałęsa

Buildings

Schools

Streets

See also
 Lech Wałęsa

References

External links

 List of international trips made by Lech Wałęsa 

Awards and honors
Walesa, Lech